Brendan Boyce (born 15 October 1986) is an Irish race walker. He competed at the 2012 Summer Olympics in the 50k walk, coming 29th, and the 2013 World Championships in Athletics where he came 25th. He competed at the 2016 Summer Olympics in the 50k walk where he finished in the top twenty, bettering his performance of the previous Olympiad. In 2021, he represented Ireland at the 2020 Summer Olympics, placing 10th in the men's 50 kilometres walk.

Competition record

References

External links
 
 
 
 

1986 births
Living people
Athletes (track and field) at the 2012 Summer Olympics
Athletes (track and field) at the 2016 Summer Olympics
Athletes from the Republic of Ireland
Irish male racewalkers
Olympic athletes of Ireland
People from Letterkenny
Sportspeople from County Donegal
World Athletics Championships athletes for Ireland
Athletes (track and field) at the 2020 Summer Olympics